The Minister for Information in Ghana usually heads the Ministry of Information. This position has existed in various configurations until the cabinet reshuffle of 16 July 2014 when President Mahama merged the functions of this ministry into that of the Ministry of Communications with the Minister of Communications having oversight for both Information as well as Communications. On 16 July 2014, Mahama had another cabinet reshuffle involving a lot of ministries.

List of ministers

References

Politics of Ghana
Information